The Ambrosini SAI.2S was a four-seat light aircraft produced in Italy shortly before World War II.

Design and construction
It was a low-wing, cantilever cabin monoplane of conventional configuration with fixed, tailwheel undercarriage.

The aircraft was primarily of wooden construction, the fuselage being a wooden monocoque and the two-spar wing having a duralumin-covered centre-section built integral with the fuselage and internally reinforced with steel tubes. The wing carried Handley Page slots and split flaps, and dual controls were fitted.

Operation
The type was produced in small numbers, for use by private pilot owners. Two examples were operational in 1965. One aircraft was still extant , and is preserved at the Gianni Caproni Museum of Aeronautics at Trento Airport.

Despite the similar designation, this design was unrelated to the earlier SAI.2

Specifications

References

 
 
 
 

SAI Ambrosini aircraft
Single-engined tractor aircraft
Low-wing aircraft
1930s Italian civil utility aircraft
Aircraft first flown in 1937